Fatherland is a 1994 American historical drama television film directed by Christopher Menaul and written by Stanley Weiser and Ron Hutchinson, based on the 1992 novel of the same title by Robert Harris. The film stars Rutger Hauer and Miranda Richardson, and aired on HBO on November 26, 1994.

Plot
A prologue outlines the story's alternate timeline. The failure of the Normandy invasion causes the United States to withdraw from the European theater of the Second World War and General Dwight D. Eisenhower to retire in disgrace. The United States continues its Pacific War against the Empire of Japan, and led by General Douglas MacArthur, it uses atomic bombs for its victory. In Europe, Nazi Germany successfully achieves its invasion of the United Kingdom, which results in King George VI fleeing with his family to Canada and continuing to rule the British Empire. Under Nazi supervision, Edward VIII assumes the throne in the United Kingdom, and Wallis Simpson becomes his queen.

Prime Minister Winston Churchill also goes into exile in Canada and lives there until his death in 1953. Germany controls the rest of Europe, except for neutral Switzerland and the Vatican, into the Greater German Reich, which is abbreviated to "Germania". At least on the surface, German society is largely clean and orderly, and the SS is reorganised into an elite peacetime police force.

The state is still embroiled in its perpetual war against the Soviet Union, which is still led by the 85-year-old Joseph Stalin well into the 1960s. The 1960 US presidential election is won by Joseph Kennedy, whose anti-Semitic views have been well-publicized. He gives the Nazi leaders a chance to end the Cold War between both powers and to secure a détente with the United States and its allies in Latin America. In 1964, as Adolf Hitler's 75th birthday approaches. Kennedy heads to a summit meeting in Germany, whose borders are being opened to media from the United States and Latin America.

A week before the summit, a body is discovered to be floating in a lake near Berlin by Hermann Jost, who is an SS cadet in training. SS Major Xavier March is assigned the case and questions Jost, who admits that he saw the body being dumped by Odilo "Globus" Globočnik, an Obergruppenführer of the Gestapo and a right-hand man of the SS leader, Reinhard Heydrich. The dead man is revealed to be Josef Bühler, a retired Nazi Party official who managed the Jewish resettlement to the German territories in Eastern Europe during the Second World War. The Gestapo takes over the case for reasons of "state security", and Jost dies in an apparent training accident.

Meanwhile, Charlotte "Charlie" Maguire, a member of a visiting American press entourage, is discreetly given an envelope by an old man at her hotel. Inside it is a photograph of several high-ranking Nazi officials outside a villa. A note on the photograph leads her to Wilhelm Stuckart, another retired party official, but she finds him dead at his apartment.

March is reassigned to the Stuckart case, but when he takes Maguire to the crime scene, the Gestapo claims jurisdiction, and his superior, Arthur Nebe, warns him against further investigation. When they follow up on the photo, Maguire and March visit Wannsee to learn the identities of the men. All of them attended the Wannsee Conference and are found to have died under suspicious circumstances except one. The only survivor is Franz Luther, the old man who gave Maguire the picture.

March tells her to get out of Germany since he now realises that there is a plot by the regime's highest levels to cover up whatever was discussed at the conference. Luther contacts Maguire and asks her to meet him on a train, where he requests her to communicate his desire for safe passage to the United States in exchange for what he knows about "the biggest secret of the war". SS troops corner Luther and kill him, but March rescues Maguire. He later blackmails a colleague to get Luther's file and learns that he had a mistress, the former stage actress Anna von Hagen.

Maguire, posing as an official of the American embassy in Berlin to process Luther's safe passage, visits Hagen and obtains Luther's papers. Hagen reveals that the Jews were not really resettled but that they were killed en masse by the Germans during the war, as had been planned at the conference.

March is horrified by the pictures and the documents, which prove that the events actually happened, and he agrees to join Maguire and to escape Germany with his son, Pili. However, the Gestapo has already persuaded Pili to betray March, who is lured into a trap by Globus. During his escape, March kills a Gestapo agent but is mortally wounded. He manages to reach a phone booth to call Pili for a final time and then dies.

As Kennedy arrives at Berlin's Great Hall, a member of the press entourage helps Maguire when she slips the documents to him through the US ambassador. When Kennedy looks at the materials, he abruptly cancels the scheduled meeting with Hitler and immediately flies back to the U.S.

The epilogue reveals that the narrator is a grown-up Pili, who notes that although Maguire was eventually arrested by the Gestapo, the revelation of the extermination of European Jews derailed any prospect of a strategic alliance with the United States. Eventually, revolutions occurred across Europe and resulted in the Nazi regime's collapse.

Cast
 Rutger Hauer as Sturmbannführer Xavier March
 Miranda Richardson as Charlie Maguire
 Peter Vaughan as SS-Oberst-Gruppenführer Arthur Nebe
 Jean Marsh as Anna von Hagen
 Michael Kitchen as Untersturmführer Max Jäger
 John Woodvine as Franz Luther
 John Shrapnel as Obergruppenführer Odilo Globocnik, aka "Globus"
 Rupert Penry-Jones as Hermann Jost
 Clive Russell as Karl Krebs
 Clare Higgins as Klara
 Neil Dudgeon as Hauptsturmführer Walther Fiebes
 Patronella Barker as Helga Schröder
 Rupert Degas as Narrator (uncredited)

Production
Mike Nichols bought the film rights before the novel was published in the United States. When a theatrical film proved unfeasible, the production moved to HBO. The film was budgeted at $7 million and was filmed entirely in Prague.

The newly opened Praha Penta Hotel, which is now Hilton Prague Old Town, doubled for Berlin's Hotel Adlon in which Maguire stays. The headquarters of Radio Free Europe, now the New Building of the National Museum, served as the Berlin Police headquarters, where March works. The National Monument in Vitkov was used as the Sepp Dietrich SS Academy. The rear façade of the headquarters of Motokov, the Czech state car company, now the City Empiria tower, served as the exterior of the Reichsarchiv. The Nazi rally in the finale was filmed at Letná Park, including at the former Stalin Monument.

Reception
The film received mixed reviews. The review aggregator Rotten Tomatoes rated it at 50% from six reviews.

Ken Tucker of Entertainment Weekly graded the film at B+. He states that the book's plot was faithfully reproduced and helped pull good performances from Hauer and Richardson. He also noted Menaul's directing by adding small details such as advertisements on the Beatles' shows. However, he states that the revelation's predictability detracted from the film.

Since the adaptation's release, Harris announced he was disappointed with it. Speaking to The Independent in 2012, he said:

Awards
Richardson received a Golden Globe Award in 1995 for Best Performance by an Actress in a Supporting Role in a Series, Mini-Series or Motion Picture Made for TV for her performance. Hauer's performance was also nominated, as well as the film itself. The film also received an Emmy nomination in 1995 for Special Visual Effects.

Gallery

References

External links

 

1994 television films
1994 films
1994 drama films
1990s American films
1990s English-language films
1990s historical drama films 
Alternate Nazi Germany films
American alternate history films
American drama television films
American historical drama films
Films based on British novels
Films based on science fiction novels
Films directed by Christopher Menaul
Films scored by Gary Chang
Films set in 1964
Films set in Berlin
Films shot in Prague
HBO Films films
Historical television films
Television films based on books
World War II television films